Saad ait Khorsa, born  in Safi, Morocco, is a Moroccan footballer who plays as a defender for FUS Rabat.

He is considered to be one of the best left backs in Botola. He scored in the last group stage match of the 2017 UAFA Club Championship to help secure the qualification of his club to the semi-final.

References

1994 births
Living people
Moroccan footballers
Olympic Club de Safi players
Fath Union Sport players
Association football fullbacks